Hail to Reason (April 18, 1958 – February 24, 1976) was an American Thoroughbred racehorse and an influential sire. In a racing career cut short by injury, he was named the American Champion Two-Year-Old Colt of 1960 after winning seven stakes races including the Hopeful Stakes. He later became a leading sire whose offspring included Epsom Derby winner Roberto and leading sire Halo, who in turn sired the great Sunday Silence.

Background
Hail to Reason was bred in Kentucky by the Bieber-Jacobs Stable, a partnership of prominent horsemen, Isadore Bieber and Hirsch Jacobs. He was sired by the English stakes winner Turn-To, a grandson of the very influential sire Nearco. Hail to Reason was out of the mare Nothirdchance, a stakes winning daughter of Blue Swords. She was named by Jacobs as a warning to the Allies to not allow Germany to start another war. Hail to Reason was named in response to his fulfilled hopes.

Racing career
Starting in January 1958, Hail to Reason raced 18 times as a two-year-old in nine months, winning nine times. He set a track record of :58 for 5 furlongs is his debut at Aqueduct, followed up by wins in the Youthful, Great American and Tremont at the same track. He also won the Sapling Stakes at Monmouth, the World's Playground Stakes at Atlantic City and the Sanford Stakes at Saratoga. The highlight of his campaign was winning the prestigious Hopeful Stakes at Saratoga while setting a new track record of 1:16 for  furlongs.

During a morning workout in September, he lost a shoe and broke both sesamoid bones in his near front leg, ending his career.  However, he was still named 1960 American Champion Two-Year-Old Colt.

Stud record
Retired to stud at Hagyard Farm near Lexington, Kentucky, Hail to Reason was an outstanding stallion and earned Leading sire in North America honors for 1970.  His progeny includes:

Hail to Reason was also a very successful broodmare sire whose daughters have produced more than one hundred stakes winners, including Allez France and Triptych. Another daughter, Reason to Earn, is the dam of Bold Reasoning, sire of 1977 U.S. Triple Crown Champion Seattle Slew.

At 18, Hail to Reason was humanely put down on February 24, 1976, and is buried at Hagyard Farm.

Pedigree

References

1958 racehorse births
1976 racehorse deaths
Racehorses bred in Kentucky
Racehorses trained in the United States
American Champion racehorses
United States Champion Thoroughbred Sires
Horse monuments
Thoroughbred family 4-n
Chefs-de-Race